Hardball is an American crime drama television series that ran on NBC from September 21, 1989 to June 29, 1990, during the 1989–90 television schedule.

Synopsis
Hardball is a variation of the buddy cop genre that focused on two plainclothes L.A. cops, Charlie "C.B." Battles (John Ashton) and Joe "Kaz" Kaczierowski (Richard Tyson). Battles is a 45-year-old hard-nosed veteran officer who is forced to take a desk job or retire. Battles is soon assigned a new partner, the 25-year-old hotshot Kaczierowski who follows his own set of rules when dealing with criminals. The pair are soon at odds over their respective methods of law enforcement.

NBC President Brandon Tartikoff saw this series as inspired by the Lethal Weapon films and Battles was patterned after Pete Rose.

Cast
John Ashton as Charlie "C.B." Battles
 Richard Tyson as Joe "Kaz" Kaczierowski
 John Pappas as Pappas
 Barney McFadden as Ballantine

Production notes
The series was created by Robert Palm and executive produced by John Ashley and Frank Lupo.

Theme song
The series' theme song "Roll It Over", was written by Sylvester Levay, Mark Spiro, and Eddie Money. Money also performed the tune.

Episodes

References

External links
 
 

1989 American television series debuts
1990 American television series endings
1980s American crime drama television series
1990s American crime drama television series
American action television series
English-language television shows
Television series by Sony Pictures Television
Television series by Universal Television
NBC original programming
Television shows set in Los Angeles